Joseph Algernon Wells (September 9, 1885 – October 20, 1946) was a British track and field athlete who competed in the 1912 Summer Olympics. He was born and died in Ware.

In 1912 he was eliminated in the semi-finals of the 400 metres competition. In the 200 meters event he was eliminated in the first round.

References

External links
sports-reference.com
olympics.org.uk

1885 births
1946 deaths
British male sprinters
Olympic athletes of Great Britain
Athletes (track and field) at the 1912 Summer Olympics